Manzuri (also Romanized as Manz̧ūrī) is a village in Zaboli Rural District, in the Central District of Mehrestan County, Sistan and Baluchestan Province, Iran. At the 2006 census, its population was 172, in 45 families.

References 

Populated places in Mehrestan County